Kiyoshi Saitō may refer to:

, Japanese printmaker
, Japanese footballer
, Japanese table tennis player, Olympic athlete